Cecil Hoffmann (born July 11, 1962) is an American film and television actress.

Career
Best known for her portrayal of district attorney Zoey Clemmons in the television series L.A. Law, Hoffman starred on 26 episodes, spanning three seasons, from Spring of 1991 to Fall of 1992. She found success on the big screen, turning in memorable performances in hit films Stargate (1993) and the Wyatt Earp biopic Tombstone (1994) with Kurt Russell.  She also starred as Greer Monroe with William Devane in the ABC political soap opera The Monroes, which lasted just nine episodes in 1995-1996 television season.

In addition to L.A. Law and her motion picture work, Hoffman also starred in the NBC drama Dream Street (1989) with Thomas Calabro and as Hillary Stein, was a regular on the final season of Wiseguy in 1990.  In 1996, she had a three episode guest-starring arc on ER and made two appearances on Picket Fences.

She has guest-starred in TV series such as Strong Medicine, Providence, Any Day Now, The Larry Sanders Show, Madman of the People, and Family Law.

References

External links

1962 births
American television actresses
Living people
People from McLean, Virginia
Princeton University alumni
Circle in the Square Theatre School alumni
21st-century American women